is a Japan-exclusive platform game released in 1994 for the Game Gear. The game stars the Coca-Cola Kid, Coca-Cola's Japanese mascot of the 1990s. It was also included with a special red Game Gear bundle.

Gameplay
The game uses timed platform game sequences. Power-ups include the famous Coca-Cola soft drink that helps restore health and the coins that helps the player buy items between stages.

Each stage has a 9:59 time limit. Attacks in the games include kicks and flying kicks. Obstacles, like the telephone booths in the downtown level, can also be torn down.

Notes

References

1994 video games
Advergames
Works based on advertisements
Coca-Cola
Game Gear games
Game Gear-only games
Japan-exclusive video games
Side-scrolling platform games
Video games about food and drink
Video games developed in Japan
Single-player video games
Aspect Co. games